Charity Lake is a lake located on Vancouver Island is an expansion of Ralph River south of Mount Albert Edward in Strathcona Provincial Park,

References

Alberni Valley
Lakes of Vancouver Island
Comox Land District